Spike the Bulldog is the mascot for the Gonzaga University Bulldogs, also known officially as the Zags.

History
In Gonzaga's early football history, the teams were called the "Blue and Whites" or "The Fighting Irish". After a football game in 1921, a reporter wrote that Gonzaga fought tenaciously like bulldogs. Thus, that description became the new mascot. Over the years, Gonzaga has had numerous live bulldogs as mascots.

Human mascots replaced live dogs in 1980 when a Gonzaga student, Mike Griffin, wore a cape and called himself "Captain Zag." He remained the Gonzaga mascot from 1980 until 1982. A few more students donned the Captain Zag uniform before a bulldog mascot returned in 1985. Spike was named by Craig Evans a 6 year old of the assistant basketball coach Bill Evans. Lee Mauney, a student from Hatchie Bottom, Mississippi, introduced the Gonzaga crowd to the first costumed bulldog mascot in 1985. He held the role from 1985-88.

Spike has become synonymous with Gonzaga Athletics. In 2000, Spike rose to national prominence when he was among a group of mascots that appeared in Nike's "Welcome to Bracketville" promotional commercials for the NCAA Tournament.

References

College mascots in the United States
Gonzaga University
Mascots introduced in 1921
Dog mascots